Moby-Dick is an 1851 novel by Herman Melville.

"Moby Dick" may also refer to:

Arts, entertainment, and media

Fictional entities
 Moby Dick (whale), the white whale in the novel

Films
Moby Dick (1930 film), a film starring John Barrymore
Moby Dick (1956 film), a film by John Huston starring Gregory Peck
Moby Dick (unfinished film), an unfinished 1971 film by Orson Welles
Moby Dick (1978 film), a one-man version
Moby Dick (2010 film), a modern-day military version
Moby Dick (2011 film), a South Korean film directed by Park In-je

Television
Moby Dick (1998 miniseries), a miniseries starring Patrick Stewart and Gregory Peck
Moby Dick (2011 miniseries), a miniseries by Mike Barker, starring William Hurt and Ethan Hawke
Moby Dick and Mighty Mightor, a 1960s Hanna-Barbera cartoon
"Moby Dick", an episode of 3rd Rock from the Sun

Other uses in arts, entertainment, and media
Moby Dick (cantata), a 1938 cantata by Bernard Herrmann
"Moby Dick" (instrumental), an instrumental tune and drum solo by Led Zeppelin
Moby Dick (musical), a 1992 musical
Moby-Dick (2019 musical), a 2019 musical
Moby Dick (Serbian band), a pop-dance band formed in 1990
Moby-Dick (opera), a 2010 opera by Jake Heggie

Animals
Moby Dick (Rhine), a beluga or white whale
Sirenoscincus mobydick, a species of lizard

Other uses
Moby Dick (Alaska), a mountain in Alaska
Moby Dick Mountain, a summit in British Columbia
Moby Dick (restaurant), a Persian restaurant chain in Washington
Porsche 935/78 or Moby Dick, a car model

See also
 Adaptations of Moby-Dick
 Mo B. Dick, music producer and rapper
Moby Dick—Rehearsed, a 1955 play by Orson Welles
 Moby Duck (disambiguation)